Cerotoma is a genus of leaf beetles in the family Chrysomelidae. There are about seven described species in Cerotoma. They are found in North America and the Neotropics.

Species
These seven species belong to the genus Cerotoma:
 Cerotoma arcuata Olivier, 1791
 Cerotoma atrofasciata Jacoby, 1879
 Cerotoma dilatipes Jacoby, 1888
 Cerotoma rubrimarginata (Lever, 1930)
 Cerotoma ruficornis (Olivier, 1791)
 Cerotoma trifurcata (Forster, 1771) (bean leaf beetle)
 Cerotoma variegata Fabricius, 1792

References

Further reading

 
 

Galerucinae
Chrysomelidae genera
Articles created by Qbugbot
Taxa named by Louis Alexandre Auguste Chevrolat